Jorge Miguel Goncálvez Rojo (born 2 March 1967 in Montevideo) is a former Uruguayan footballer.

Club career
Goncálvez played for Cruz Azul in the Primera División de Mexico and Ferro Carril Oeste in the Primera División de Argentina

International career
Goncálvez made nine appearances for the senior Uruguay national football team from 1988 to 1996.

Personal life 
Jorge is the son of the former Uruguayan footballer, Néstor Gonçalves.

References

External links
 

1967 births
Living people
Uruguayan footballers
Uruguay international footballers
Peñarol players
Club Atlético River Plate (Montevideo) players
C.A. Cerro players
Cruz Azul footballers
Ferro Carril Oeste footballers
Footballers from Montevideo
Association football defenders